Ling Yong (born 1978) is a Paralympic athlete from China competing in P54-58 pentathlon events (seated shot put, seated javelin throw, 200m wheelchair sprint, seated discus throw, 1500m wheelchair race).

Ling contracted poliomyelitis in his youth. He began competing in wheelchair marathons in 1999. He competed in the 2004 Summer Paralympics in Athens, Greece. There he won a gold medal in the men's Pentathlon – P54-58 event with a world record performance that still stands in January 2013.

References

External links
 

Paralympic athletes of China
Athletes (track and field) at the 2004 Summer Paralympics
Paralympic gold medalists for China
Living people
Chinese pentathletes
World record holders in Paralympic athletics
1978 births
Medalists at the 2004 Summer Paralympics
Paralympic medalists in athletics (track and field)
21st-century Chinese people